Apleurus lutulentus is a species of cylindrical weevil in the beetle family Curculionidae. It is found in North America.

References

Further reading

External links

 

Lixinae
Articles created by Qbugbot
Beetles described in 1859